Mishima may refer to:

Places
 Mishima, Fukushima, a town in Fukushima Prefecture
 Mishima, Kagoshima, a village in Kagoshima Prefecture
 Mishima, Niigata, a town in Niigata Prefecture
 Mishima, Shizuoka, a city in Shizuoka Prefecture, Japan
 Mishima District, Osaka, a district in Osaka Prefecture, Japan
 Mishima Island, Yamaguchi, an island outside Hagi in Yamaguchi Prefecture, Japan
 Mishima cattle, an endangered cattle breed found on the island

Other uses
 People named Mishima (surname); most notably, Japanese writer Yukio Mishima
 Mishima, a megacorporation in Mutant Chronicles
 Mishima: A Life in Four Chapters, a 1985 film directed by Paul Schrader
 Mishima: A Life in Four Chapters (soundtrack), soundtrack to the 1985 film performed by Kronos Quartet and composed by Philip Glass
 Mishima pottery, slip inlay style of ceramic pottery adopted from Korea probably in the 16th century
 , a predreadnought battleship of the Imperial Japanese Navy
 Mishima (band), a Catalan indie pop band
 Mishima Zaibatsu, a fictional company owned by the Mishima family in the Tekken series